Tanja Ćirov (born 26 February 1981) is a Bulgarian-Serbian female professional basketball player.

References

External links
Profile at eurobasket.com

1981 births
Living people
People from Bor, Serbia
Serbian women's basketball players
Bulgarian women's basketball players
Serbian people of Bulgarian descent
Small forwards
Shooting guards